Bolton is an unincorporated community in Stephenson County, Illinois, United States.

Notes

Unincorporated communities in Stephenson County, Illinois
Unincorporated communities in Illinois